Yevgeni Nikolayevich Kashentsev (born 12 March 1971) is a retired Belarusian professional footballer. He also holds Russian citizenship.

He is the older brother of Nikolai Kashentsev.

Honours
Dinamo Minsk
 Belarusian Premier League champion: 1992, 1992–93, 1993–94, 1994–95, 1995
 Belarusian Cup winner: 1992, 1993–94
Maccabi Tel Aviv
 Israeli Premier League champion: 1995–96
 Israel State Cup winner: 1995–96

External links
 

1971 births
Living people
Sportspeople from Barnaul
Soviet footballers
Russian footballers
Russia under-21 international footballers
Belarusian footballers
Belarusian expatriate footballers
Belarus international footballers
Belarusian Premier League players
Soviet Top League players
FC Dynamo Barnaul players
FC Dinamo Minsk players
Maccabi Tel Aviv F.C. players
Hapoel Tayibe F.C. players
Hapoel Rishon LeZion F.C. players
Expatriate footballers in Israel
Belarusian expatriate sportspeople in Israel
Association football forwards
Association football midfielders